Porrorhynchus is a genus of beetles in the family Gyrinidae, containing the following species:

 Porrorhynchus indicans (Walker, 1858)
 Porrorhynchus landaisi Régimbart, 1892
 Porrorhynchus marginatus Laporte, 1835

The subgenus Rhomborhynchus Ochs, 1926, containing the species Porrorhynchus depressus Régimbart, 1892 and Porrorhynchus misoolensis (Ochs, 1955), was tenatively transferred to Dineutus in 2017.

References

Gyrinidae
Adephaga genera
Taxa named by François-Louis Laporte, comte de Castelnau